Sugimoto is a Japanese surname. Notable people with the surname include:

, Japanese sport shooter
, Japanese television personality, actress, dancer and writer
, Japanese footballer
, Japanese economist and academic
, Japanese writer
Henry Sugimoto (1900–1990), American artist
, Japanese golfer
, Japanese photographer
, Japanese footballer
, Japanese shogi player
, Japanese footballer
, Japanese footballer
 Kenkichi Sugimoto (1905-2004), Japanese painter
, Japanese footballer
, Japanese volleyball player
, Japanese inventor
, Japanese footballer
Masao Sugimoto (born 1967), Japanese footballer
, Japanese shogi player
, Japanese footballer
, Japanese judoka
, Japanese actress
, Japanese swimmer
, Japanese squash player
, Japanese footballer
, Japanese rhythmic gymnast
, Japanese footballer
Taku Sugimoto, Japanese guitarist
, Japanese footballer
, Japanese footballer
, Japanese sprinter
, Japanese actor
, Japanese sociologist
, Japanese voice actress
, Japanese model, actress, gravure idol and singer

Japanese-language surnames